KurdishMedia.com was a pro-Kurdish news and commentary website dedicated to providing news and information about Kurds and Kurdistan since August 4, 1998. KurdishMedia.com is an independent information provider, not affiliated to any political or non-political organisation.

Today, KurdishMedia.com is the most significant repository of information about Kurds and Kurdistan and, with several millions of hits per month, is the most frequently visited Kurdish library.

Mission
The intention of KurdishMedia.com is to continue to make a positive contribution to peace, equality and stability throughout Kurdistan, and:

 Develop a scientific approach to the Kurdish issue, including towards its language, art and culture. 
 Create new definitions for the future of the Kurdish nation within the international arena. 
 Create a sphere for Kurdish thinkers and strategists to be able to further develop upon the Kurdish issue. 
 Introduce Kurds as a civilised nation in the international arena. 
 Define a state of "United Kurdistan" as an isle of peace at the heart of the Middle East.

Rebwar Fatah is the director and co-founder of KurdishMedia.com.
Peshraw Namo is the Webmaster and co-founder of KurdishMedia.com. Welat Lezgin is the editor of KurdishMedia.com.

References

External links
KurdishMedia
Leading Services
Professor Thomas Hylland Eriksen, Nations in cyberspace

Iraqi news websites
Kurdish organisations